El Monte Station is a large regional bus station in the city of El Monte, California, United States, adjacent to Interstate 10, serving the Metro J Line, Foothill Transit, Greyhound Lines, and El Monte Transit. It is the Metro J Line's eastern terminus.

History 
The El Monte Busway was conceived in 1969 as a way to allow travelers to avoid traffic on Interstate 10 (San Bernardino Freeway), promising an 18-minute trip between El Monte and Downtown Los Angeles, compared to 35-45 minutes in the general-purpose lanes. At the El Monte end of the line, a $945,000 terminal would be built, then described as the world’s first bus rapid transit station. The station was described as having a "Space Age" design, stemming from its unique circular shape billed as providing easy access for buses from both directions. The station opened on July 14, 1973.

The service was popular and by 1975, the El Monte station was serving 12,000 passengers per day. For commuters, they could park their cars in one of the parking lots, then hop on a bus for the traffic-free ride to downtown Los Angeles. The parking lots had to be expanded several times in order to meet demand. For those not in cars, the station was an important transit transfer point, in express services to downtown, local and express buses fanned out to the north, east and south of the station.

Ridership would continue to grow over the next few decades, and the station would continue to age. By 2006, the El Monte Busway was being used by 40,000 passengers on 1,100 bus trips per day, and the El Monte Station had become the busiest bus station west of Chicago and was operating well beyond its originally intended capacity. In an effort to relieve overcrowding, Metro opened six new bus bays in the parking lot just west of the main station in 2006.

On December 13, 2009, Metro launched its second Metro Busway bus rapid transit service, the Silver Line (now J Line) utilizing both the El Monte Busway and the Harbor Transitway. The new higher frequency service would be funded by converting both corridors into high occupancy toll (HOT) lanes, to be branded as the Metro ExpressLanes. The tolls would be used to fund improvements to the aging stations along both corridors.

One of the first locations to be improved was the El Monte Station. In 2010, the old station was demolished and replaced a two-level terminal nearly twice the size. The new US$60 million station would feature more bus bays, a large public plaza, a bicycle parking station, and customer service offices. The new station opened to the public on Sunday, October 14, 2012.

Layout 
The entrance to the station is located at the corner of Santa Anita Ave and Ramona Boulevard. The new layout of El Monte Station features 17 new bus berths on the lower level and 12 additional berths on the upper level. The design of the station is such that there are no at grade crossings of passengers and buses. Although the upper level is at existing grade, passengers are required to descend into the lower level and return to the ground level.

Just west of this station the transitway moves off the separate right of way and moves into the middle of Interstate 10. The station has a 1,760 space park and ride lot. There are additional spaces in Downtown El Monte which can be used by commuters. The station also has a connection to the Rio Hondo bicycle trail via Pioneer Park, which is north of the station. Previously the station had a connection through the parking lot, but that was fenced off when construction of the new terminal began.

The Division 9 bus yard is located next to the bus station, and buses coming into, or going out of service, enter and leave from that yard.

Services 
With 22,000 passengers and 1,200 bus departures daily the station was doubled in size in a renovation which was completed in October 2012. Of all the 9 Metro J Line stations, the El Monte Station is the busiest and most served.  With the "Silver 2 Silver" program, Cal State LA students who have Metro passes can use the Foothill Transit's Silver Streak bus between Downtown Los Angeles and El Monte Station at no additional charge. Similarly, Foothill Transit Silver Streak riders may use their passes on the Metro J Line between El Monte Station and Downtown Los Angeles.

Staffed counters are available for Foothill Transit, Metro ExpressLanes, and Greyhound.

Due to demand, the Metro J Line runs a 24-hour night time service between El Monte Station and Harbor Gateway Transit Center, as of June 25, 2017.

, the following services are available:
Metro J Line
Foothill Transit: Silver Streak, 
El Monte Transit: Blue, Green, Red
Greyhound Lines
Hollywood Bowl Shuttle
Norwalk Transit: 7

References

External links 
El Monte Station at Foothill Transit
El Monte Station Expansion – Metro

Los Angeles Metro Busway stations
El Monte, California
Bus stations in Los Angeles County, California
J Line (Los Angeles Metro)
Transport infrastructure completed in 1973
1973 establishments in California
Transport infrastructure completed in 2012
2012 establishments in California
Proposed California High-Speed Rail stations

es:Línea Plata (Metro de Los Ángeles)